Old St Paul's (formerly St Paul's Pro-Cathedral) is a historic site, a city landmark (tourist attraction) and a wedding and event venue in the heart of Wellington, the capital city of New Zealand. The building served a dual role as the parish church of Thorndon and the pro-cathedral (provisional cathedral) of the Diocese of Wellington of the Anglican Church between 1866 and 1964. It exemplifies 19th-century Gothic Revival architecture adapted to colonial conditions and materials, and stands at 34 Mulgrave Street, Pipitea, close to Parliament Buildings.

History 
 George Selwyn, the first Bishop of New Zealand, purchased part of the site of the church in 1845 and Governor George Grey added to it in 1853, at which time the land stood on a prominent cliff-top overlooking Wellington harbour.  Agreement to build the church was reached by 1861 and the Reverend Frederick Thatcher, then vicar of St Paul's, Thorndon, was engaged as the architect.

The foundation stone was laid by Governor Grey on 21 August 1865. The building work was executed by John McLaggan and a team of eight carpenters, and the church was consecrated by Bishop Abraham on 6 June 1866.

Soon after the church opened, it became apparent that it was unstable in high winds, and so the south transept, designed by Christian Julius Toxward, was added in 1868. Later additions included the north transept and north-aisle
extension, also by Toxward, in 1874; the moving of the chancel five metres to the east and the addition of minor north and south transepts to the design of George Fannin in 1876; the choir vestry in 1882, probably designed by Toxward; and extension of the baptistry as designed by Frederick de Jersey Clere in 1891. Thatcher’s original wooden shingle roof was replaced with corrugated iron in 1895, and subsequently with Welsh slates in 1924.

In 1964 the Diocese of Wellington moved to the new St Paul's Cathedral nearby.  After a significant battle to prevent its demolition, Old St Paul's was purchased by the New Zealand Government in 1967, and subsequently restored by the Ministry of Works under the guidance of Peter Sheppard.

Architecture

Old St Paul's is built in a Gothic style, albeit with a subdued effect due to the limited resources available. It is constructed from New Zealand native timbers, with stunning stained-glass windows. The interior has been likened to the upturned hull of an Elizabethan galleon, with exposed curving rimu trusses and kauri roof sarking.

Photo gallery

Current situation 

Old St Paul's is now managed by Heritage New Zealand Pouhere Taonga. While no longer used as a parish church, it remains consecrated, and is a popular venue for weddings, funerals and other services. In 2016 a celebration service of evensong was held in the cathedral to commemorate 150 years since it was consecrated.

The flags displayed in the nave include the ensigns of the Royal Navy, the  New Zealand Merchant Navy and the United States Marine Corps (second division), which was stationed in Wellington during World War II. The church retains close links with the New Zealand Defence Force.

Some of the walls and columns of Old St Paul's are decorated with memorial plaques, including many dedicated to those who fought and died in World War I.  There is a plaque in memory of Wellington historian John Beaglehole, most famous for his biography of explorer James Cook, but who also played a significant role in the fight to save Old St Paul's from demolition.

Old St Paul's was closed from May 2019 until July 2020 for seismic strengthening work.

References

External links

A selection of © photos taken during the architectural Restoration
Historical website about the church

Wellington
Religious buildings and structures in Wellington City
Frederick Thatcher church buildings
Wooden churches in New Zealand
Gothic Revival church buildings in New Zealand
Carpenter Gothic church buildings
Heritage New Zealand Category 1 historic places in the Wellington Region
Listed churches in New Zealand
1860s architecture in New Zealand
Churches in Wellington City